Nedelko 'Neville' Jelich (born 11 March 1962) is a Yugoslavian born former Australian cricket player, who played first class cricket for Queensland and Tasmania.  He debuted for Queensland in the 1985–86 season, but transferred to Tasmania the following summer, where he played until the end of the 1987–88 season. He was a left-handed middle order batsman, and scored one first class century.

He was born at Orasje, near Belgrade in the former Yugoslavia.

See also
 List of Tasmanian representative cricketers

External links
 Cricinfo Profile

1962 births
Living people
Sportspeople from Belgrade
Australian people of Serbian descent
Australian cricketers
Tasmania cricketers
Queensland cricketers
Yugoslav emigrants to Australia